Suzanne Malaxos (born 30 December 1961) is an Australian former long-distance runner. She competed in the women's marathon at the 1996 Summer Olympics.

References

External links
 

1961 births
Living people
Athletes (track and field) at the 1996 Summer Olympics
Australian female long-distance runners
Australian female marathon runners
Olympic athletes of Australia
People from Denmark, Western Australia
20th-century Australian women
21st-century Australian women